

The Holmes KH-1  is a British single-seat high-performance homebuilt sailplane designed and built by Kenneth Holmes and first flown on 27 November 1971.

Design
The KH-1 is a shoulder-wing cantilever monoplane with a conventional all-wood semi-monocoque fuselage and tail unit with an all-moving tailplane, the wings have small-span flaps for control during approach but no airbrakes or spoilers. The pilot has a semi-reclined seat in an enclosed cockpit under a two-piece transparent canopy. The KH-1 landing gear is a retractable monowheel gear and a tailskid, it is also fitted with a tail drag chute to control speed during approach.

Specifications

References

Notes

Bibliography

External links
 Image of Holmes KH-1 in 1971

1970s British sailplanes
Homebuilt aircraft
Glider aircraft